Yushut (Üšüt) is a river in Mari El, Russia, a right tributary of the Ilet.

The major inhabited localities are Mochalishche settlement and Oshutyaly village.

The river is a popular place for rafting. The area it flows through attracts sports tourists and Tolkienists.

References
 Агроклиматический справочник по Марийской АССР, 1961

Rivers of Mari El